Rhosologia is a genus of moths of the family Noctuidae.

Species
 Rhosologia porrecta Walker, 1865
 Rhosologia stigmaphiles Dyar, 1914

References
Natural History Museum Lepidoptera genus database
 Rhosologia at funet.fi

Calpinae
Moth genera